Bossier High School may refer to:

Bossier High School (322 Colquitt Street, Bossier City, Louisiana), former high school listed on the National Register of Historic Places
Bossier High School (Louisiana), current high school, also listed on the National Register of Historic Places